Miklos Perlus (born March 23, 1977) is a Canadian actor, writer, and story editor. Perlus has appeared on Canadian series Student Bodies, Road to Avonlea and Sidekick. He has written for Degrassi: The Next Generation and other series. He has also worked in television program development for several organizations.

Biography
Perlus was born in Toronto, Ontario, Canada. He attended McGill University, where he studied Cultural Studies.

Perlus played Victor Kane on Student Bodies, and Peter Craig on Road to Avonlea.
Perlus' experience has included a variety of roles in media as a writer, a story editor and he has developed several television productions. He also wrote and co-developed CTV's Instant Star, and served as a writer and story editor for Degrassi: The Next Generation. He was the co-winner of a Writers Guild of Canada award (shared with James Hurst) for an episode of Degrassi.

In 2008, Perlus became Marblemedia's Director of Content Development, where he was responsible for creating, sourcing and developing innovative multi-platform content and bringing them to fruition for television and digital media.  In 2010, he became voice of Eric for the YTV animated series, Sidekick. From 2014 - 2016 he served as Vice President, Kids and Family at Marblemedia. In 2016, Perlus created and executive produced a live-action family comedy for preschoolers called Opie's Home. In 2017 he joined the animated series Nina's World (Sprout) as Supervising Producer, after which he joined Pipeline Studios to write and produce "Doggy World" for Disney Lat Am and to write for "Elenor Wonders Why" and "Alma's Way" for PBS, the latter of which earned him an Emmy nomination for best writing. In 2021, Perlus joined Moonbug Entertainment as Creative Producer on the preschool series "CoComelon" for Netflix. He also joined WildBrain as Creative Producer on the reboot of "Caillou" producing five CG animated Specials and 52 episodes of the series for Peacock.

In 2022 Perlus released an EP of original music called "Ragged Islands" as well as a single called "Joanna."

Filmography

Film

Television

Other work

References

External links 

1977 births
Living people
Canadian male film actors
Canadian male television actors
Canadian male voice actors
Canadian male screenwriters
Male actors from Toronto
Writers from Toronto
Canadian people of Greek Cypriot descent
20th-century Canadian screenwriters
20th-century Canadian male writers
21st-century Canadian screenwriters
21st-century Canadian male writers